Dong Qing (born 17 November 1973) is a Chinese television host. From 2005 to 2017, she has hosted the annual CCTV New Year's Gala.

She has won the Golden Mike Award's for Television in 2001 and 2006, and has received Golden Eagle Award for Best Programme Host in 2006.

Biography
Dong was born in a highly educated family in Shanghai in 1973, both her father and mother were graduates of Fudan University.

Dong secondary studied at Jiaxing No.1 High School, she graduated from Shanghai Theatre Academy in 1993, where she majored in broadcast, then she studied at East China Normal University.

Dong worked in Zhejiang Television from 1993 to 1995 and OTV from 1995 to 2002.

From May 2002 to present, Dong worked in China Central Television.

Dong hosted the CCTV New Year's Gala from 2005 to 2017.

In 2016, she began her plan to produce a show about reading.  The first episode of her show Readers went on air in February 2017 and became an instant hit.

Awards
 2001 Golden Mic Award's for Television
 2006 Golden Mic Award's for Television
 2006 Golden Eagle Award for Best Programme Host

Personal life
Her first love was a Zhejiang University graduate student. She next had a relationship with a civil servant in Shanghai. She later married Chinese businessman Chunlei Mi.

References

External links
 CCTV Dong Qing 

1973 births
People from Shanghai
Shanghai Theatre Academy alumni
East China Normal University alumni
CCTV television presenters
Hosts of the CCTV New Year's Gala
Living people